1518 Rovaniemi, provisional designation , is a stony Florian asteroid from the inner regions of the asteroid belt, approximately 8 kilometers in diameter. Discovered by Yrjö Väisälä at the Turku Observatory in 1938, the asteroid was later named for the Finnish city of Rovaniemi.

Discovery 

Rovaniemi was discovered on 15 October 1938, by Finnish astronomer Yrjö Väisälä at the Turku Observatory in Southwest Finland. Six nights later, it was independently discovered by Belgian astronomer Eugène Delporte at Uccle Observatory on 21 October 1938. The Minor Planet Center, however, only recognizes the first discoverer.

The body's observation arc begins two weeks later at Simeiz on 21 October 1928, almost 10 years prior to the asteroid's official discovery observation at Turku.

Orbit and classification 

Rovaniemi is a member of the Flora family, a giant asteroid family and the largest family of stony asteroids in the main-belt. It orbits the Sun in the inner main-belt at a distance of 1.9–2.5 AU once every 3 years and 4 months (1,212 days). Its orbit has an eccentricity of 0.14 and an inclination of 7° with respect to the ecliptic.

Physical characteristics 

Rovaniemi is an assumed stony S-type asteroid, which corresponds to the overall spectral type of the Flora family.

Rotation period 

In January 2009, two rotational lightcurves of Rovaniemi were obtained from photometric observations by René Roy at Blauvac Observatory in France, and by Brian Warner at the Palmer Divide Observatory in Colorado, United States. Lightcurve analysis gave a rotation period of 5.247 and 5.249 hours with a brightness amplitude of 0.26 and 0.25 magnitude, respectively.

Spin axis 

In 2013, an international study modeled a lightcurve from various data sources including the Uppsala Asteroid Photometric Catalogue and the Palomar Transient Factory survey. The lightcurve gave a concurring period of 5.25047 hours and allowed for the determination of two spin axis of (62.0°, 60.0°) and (265.0°, 45.0°) in ecliptic coordinates (λ, β).

Diameter and albedo 

According to the survey carried out by the NEOWISE mission of NASA's Wide-field Infrared Survey Explorer, Rovaniemi measures between 7.46 and 9.019 kilometers in diameter and its surface has an albedo between 0.2631 and 0.340.

The Collaborative Asteroid Lightcurve Link assumes an albedo of 0.24 – derived from 8 Flora, the Flora family's largest member and namesake – and calculates a diameter of 8.98 kilometers based on an absolute magnitude of 12.4.

Naming 

This minor planet was named after the Finnish city of Rovaniemi, located just six kilometers south of the Arctic Circle. The official  was published by the Minor Planet Center on 20 February 1976.

Notes

References

External links 
 Asteroid Lightcurve Database (LCDB), query form (info )
 Dictionary of Minor Planet Names, Google books
 Asteroids and comets rotation curves, CdR – Observatoire de Genève, Raoul Behrend
 Discovery Circumstances: Numbered Minor Planets (1)-(5000) – Minor Planet Center
 
 

001518
Discoveries by Yrjö Väisälä
Named minor planets
19381015